Terrance Pennington (born September 25, 1983) is a former American football guard and offensive tackle. He was drafted by the Buffalo Bills in the seventh round of the 2006 NFL Draft. He played college football at New Mexico.

Pennington was also a member of the Atlanta Falcons and New York Giants.

Professional career

Buffalo Bills
Pennington was drafted in the 2006 NFL Draft out of the University of New Mexico. He took over as the starting right tackle position for the Bills midway through the 2006 season.

Pennington was released by the Bills during final roster cuts on September 1, 2007.

Atlanta Falcons
On October 23, 2007 the Atlanta Falcons signed Pennington following a season-ending injury to Renardo Foster. He played in five games for the Falcons before being placed on injured reserve with a torn pectoral on December 26.

On August 30, 2008, the Falcons released him.

New York Giants
After spending the 2008 season out of football, Pennington was signed by the New York Giants on January 16, 2009. He was waived on August 31.

External links
New Mexico Lobos bio
New York Giants bio

1983 births
Living people
Players of American football from Los Angeles
American football offensive tackles
American football offensive guards
New Mexico Lobos football players
Buffalo Bills players
Atlanta Falcons players
New York Giants players